Brian Snow (September 5, 1943December 4, 2022) served in the U.S. National Security Agency from 1971 to 2006, including a six-year term as Technical Director of the Information Assurance Directorate  (IAD), which is the defensive arm of the NSA, charged with protecting U.S. information security.  During his time in research management positions in the NSA, he played a key role in promoting a more open and collaborative relationship between the Agency and the broader community of security professionals.

Career
In his early career Snow was a mathematics professor at Ohio University, where he helped develop the college's computer science department.  In 1971 he started working at the NSA.  During the 1970s and 1980s he designed cryptographic components and secure systems.  Several cryptographic systems employed by the U.S. government and military have used his algorithms for such purposes as nuclear command and control, tactical voice communications, and network security.  As a technical person with high managerial responsibilities,

ECC and AES
Neal Koblitz and Alfred Menezes have written that Snow was a strong supporter of the transition from RSA to Elliptic Curve Cryptography (ECC) as a public key cryptographic technology: 

Cybersecurity policy expert Susan Landau attributes the NSA's harmonious collaboration with industry and academia in the selection of the Advanced Encryption Standard (AES) in 2000 — and the Agency's support for the choice of a strong encryption algorithm designed by Europeans rather than by Americans — in part to Snow, who represented the NSA as cochairman of the Technical Working Group for the AES competition.

After the terrorist attacks of 11 September 2001, the NSA believed that it had public support for a dramatic expansion of its surveillance activities.
According to Koblitz and Menezes, the period when the NSA was a trusted partner with academia and industry in the development of cryptographic standards came to an end when, as part of the change in the NSA in the post-September 11 era, Snow was replaced as Technical Director and could no longer effectively oppose proposed actions by the offensive arm of the NSA:

Code of ethics
In Snow's last years at the NSA before his retirement in 2006, along with Clinton Brooks he led a group that drew up a draft ethics code for intelligence officers.

After retiring from the NSA, Snow worked as a security and ethics consultant. He was a member of the U.S. National Academy of Sciences Committee on Future Research Goals and Directions for Foundational Science in Cybersecurity.  He also served on the advisory board of The Calyx Institute

Recognition

In 2019 Brian Snow was inducted into the National Cyber Security Hall of Fame.

References

National Security Agency cryptographers
Living people
1943 births
University of Colorado alumni
20th-century American mathematicians
American computer scientists
People associated with computer security